Hemoglobin, alpha 2 also known as HBA2 is a gene that in humans codes for the alpha globin chain of hemoglobin.

Function 
The human alpha globin gene cluster is located on chromosome 16 and spans about 30 kb, including seven alpha like globin genes and pseudogenes: 5'- HBZ - HBZP1 - HBM - HBAP1 - HBA2 - HBA1 - HBQ1 -3'. The HBA2 (α2)  and  HBA1 (α1) coding sequences are identical. These genes differ slightly over the 5' untranslated regions and the introns, but they differ significantly over the 3' untranslated regions.

Protein 
Two alpha chains plus two beta chains constitute HbA, which in normal adult life comprises about 97% of the total hemoglobin; alpha chains combine with delta chains to constitute HbA-2, which with HbF (fetal hemoglobin) makes up the remaining 3% of adult hemoglobin.

Clinical significance 
Alpha-thalassemias most commonly result from deletions of any of the four alpha alleles, although some alpha thalassemias have been reported that are due to mutations other than deletion. Deletion of 1 or 2 alleles is clinically silent.  Deletion of 3 alleles causes HbH disease, resulting in anemia and hepatosplenomegaly.  Deletion of all 4 alleles is lethal because it renders the body unable to make fetal hemoglobin (HbF), adult hemoglobin (HbA) or adult variant hemoglobin (HbA2), and results in hydrops fetalis.

References

Further reading

External links 
  GeneReviews/NCBI/NIH/UW entry on Alpha-Thalassemia
  OMIM entries on Alpha-Thalassemia

Hemoglobins